Dolf Heijnen (25 October 1894 – 11 December 1966) was a Dutch footballer. He played in two matches for the Netherlands national football team in 1923.

References

External links
 

1894 births
1966 deaths
Dutch footballers
Netherlands international footballers
Place of birth missing
Association footballers not categorized by position